The Show of Our Lives is a compilation album of radio broadcasts, released in 1998 by Caravan.

A more extensive release of Caravan BBC recordings was issued in 2007 as The Show of Our Lives – Caravan at the BBC 1968–1975.

Track listing

Personnel 
 Pye Hastings – guitar, vocals
 Dave Sinclair – keyboards
 Richard Sinclair – bass, vocals
 Richard Coughlan – drums

References

External links 
 Caravan - The Show of Our Lives (1981) album review by Lindsay Planer, credits & releases at AllMusic.com
 
 Caravan - The Show of Our Lives (1981) album credits & user reviews at ProgArchives.com

Caravan (band) compilation albums
1998 albums
Progressive rock compilation albums